The Bruyère river is a river in Quebec, Canada. It is a tributary of the Dorval River, flowing in the municipality of Larouche, in the Le Fjord-du-Saguenay Regional County Municipality, in the administrative region of Saguenay–Lac-Saint-Jean. 

The Bruyère river valley is mainly served by the route 170 (boulevard du Royaume), for forestry and agriculture.

Forestry is the main economic activity in the Bruyère River area; agricultural activities, second.

The surface of the Bruyère River is usually frozen from the beginning of December to the end of March, however the safe circulation on the ice is generally made from mid-December to mid-March.

Geography 
The main watersheds near the Bruyère river are:
 north side: Dorval River, Saguenay River;
 east side: Dorval River, Saguenay River, rivière aux Sables, Chicoutimi River;
 south side: Kenogami Lake (Cascouia bay), Cascouia River, Pont Flottant stream, Pikauba River, ruisseau L'Abbé;
 west side: Raquette River, Abattoir stream, Bédard River, Lac Saint-Jean.

The Bruyère river rises at Lake Potvin in the shape of a deformed crescent open to the north. This source is located at:
  south of the ex-Moquin station along the Canadian National Railway;
  south of the Dorval River;
  south-east of route 170;
  south-east of the village center of Larouche;
  south-east of the confluence of the Bruyère and Dorval rivers;
  south of the Saguenay River;
  south-east of the confluence of the Dorval and Saguenay rivers.

  north-west, bending north, to the Canadian National Railway;
  westward along the Canadian National Railway and route 170 to a bend in the river;
  towards the northwest by bending towards the north, until the mouth of the river.

The course of the Bruyère river flows into a bend on the south bank of the Dorval River. This confluence is located at:
  northeast of a curve in route 170;
  south of the Saguenay River;
  north-west of Cascouia Bay;
  south-east of the confluence of the Dorval and Saguenay rivers;
  south-east of downtown Alma;
  east of lac Saint-Jean.

Toponymy 
The toponym "Bruyère river" was formalized on January 8, 1981, at the Place Names Bank of the Commission de toponymie du Québec.

Notes and references

Appendices

Related articles 
 Le Fjord-du-Saguenay Regional County Municipality
 Larouche, a municipality
 Dorval River
 Saguenay River
 List of rivers of Quebec

Le Fjord-du-Saguenay Regional County Municipality
Rivers of Saguenay–Lac-Saint-Jean